Monte Figogna is a mountain in Liguria, northern Italy, part of the Ligurian Apennines. It is located in the Municipality of Ceranesi, about 20 km from the city of Genoa. It lies at an altitude of 804 metres. In Ligurian, the mountain is called Monte Fighêugna.

On its top is located the shrine of Nostra Signora della Guardia, one of the most important Catholic place of pilgrimage in Liguria.

References

Mountains of Liguria
Mountains under 1000 metres
Mountains of the Apennines